Walter Raleigh Ely Jr. (June 24, 1913 – October 9, 1984) was a United States circuit judge of the United States Court of Appeals for the Ninth Circuit.

Education and career

Born in Baird, Callahan County, Texas, Ely received an Artium Baccalaureus degree from the University of Texas at Austin in 1935 and a Bachelor of Laws from the University of Texas School of Law in 1935. He was in private practice in Abilene, Texas from 1935 to 1938, and was an assistant state attorney general of Texas from 1939 to 1941. He served in the United States Marine Corps during World War II, from 1941 to 1944. He returned to private practice, this time in Los Angeles, California from 1945 to 1964, receiving a Master of Laws from the USC Gould School of Law in 1949 and serving as president of the Los Angeles County Bar Association in 1962.

Federal judicial service

On June 5, 1964, Ely was nominated by President Lyndon B. Johnson to a seat on the United States Court of Appeals for the Ninth Circuit vacated by Judge Oliver Deveta Hamlin Jr. Ely was confirmed by the United States Senate on July 1, 1964, and received his commission the following day. He assumed senior status on October 31, 1979, serving in that capacity until his death on October 9, 1984. He was in the majority for Warren Jones Co. v. Commissioner and gave a dissenting opinion on United States v. Jewell.

References

Sources
 

1913 births
1984 deaths
Judges of the United States Court of Appeals for the Ninth Circuit
United States court of appeals judges appointed by Lyndon B. Johnson
20th-century American judges
USC Gould School of Law alumni
United States Marine Corps personnel of World War II
People from Callahan County, Texas
University of Texas School of Law alumni